Royal Air Force Station Silverstone or more simply RAF Silverstone is a former Royal Air Force (RAF) station, the site is now used as Silverstone Circuit. It straddles the Northamptonshire and Buckinghamshire border and is named after the nearby village of Silverstone.

History

The station was the base for No. 17 Operational Training Unit RAF operating the Vickers Wellington bomber.

Current use

Today the airfield is a major racing circuit known as Silverstone Circuit. The circuit hosted the first ever Formula One World Championship race, the 1950 British Grand Prix, held on 13 May 1950. Since 1987 the track has hosted the British Grand Prix every year. The airfield's three runways, in a standard World War II era triangle, lie within the outline of the classic racetrack; after recent development of a new section of track, the main runway is transected by the circuit.  Sections of two runways are used for the smaller south circuit.

The circuit is home to the Silverstone Heliport.

See also
 List of former Royal Air Force stations

References

Royal Air Force stations in Northamptonshire
Royal Air Force stations of World War II in the United Kingdom